Sergio Novoa Rodríguez (10 June 1981) is a Colombian football manager and former player who played as a defender. He is the current assistant manager of Atlético Bucaramanga.

Coaching career

Atlético Bucaramanga
Having formerly been in charge of the U17 and U20 squads of Atlético Bucaramanga, Novoa was appointed manager of the club's first team on 10 September 2019 after Hernán Torres was fired. He was replaced by José 'Willy' Manuel Rodríguez in early November 2019 and then became a part of the new manager's technical staff. Willy was fired in mid-February and Novoa took charge of the team again, this time as a caretaker manager. Two days later, Guillermo Sanguinetti was hired.

On 15 February 2021, Novoa was named caretaker manager for the third time, until the new coach was hired on 23 February.

References

External links

1981 births
Living people
Colombian footballers
Colombian expatriate footballers
Colombian football managers
Atlético Bucaramanga footballers
Club San José players
Boyacá Chicó F.C. footballers
Chiapas F.C. footballers
Deportivo Pasto footballers
Atlético Huila footballers
Real Cartagena footballers
Alianza Petrolera players
Bnei Sakhnin F.C. players
Unión Magdalena footballers
Colombian expatriate sportspeople in Bolivia
Colombian expatriate sportspeople in Mexico
Colombian expatriate sportspeople in Israel
Expatriate footballers in Bolivia
Expatriate footballers in Mexico
Expatriate footballers in Israel
Association football midfielders
Atlético Bucaramanga managers
People from Bucaramanga
Sportspeople from Santander Department